Vitaly Yevgenyevich Nosov (born 1 February 1968  in Moscow, USSR) is a retired Russian professional basketball player. He was part of the Russian squad that won the silver medal at the 1994 and 1998 FIBA World Championship.

References

External links

1968 births
Living people
Soviet men's basketball players
Russian men's basketball players
Olympic basketball players of the Unified Team
Basketball players at the 1992 Summer Olympics
BC Avtodor Saratov players
KK Olimpija players
BC Dynamo Moscow players
1994 FIBA World Championship players